The following is a timeline of the history of the city of Metz, France.

Prior to 19th century

 1st–2nd C. CE –  built.
 2nd C. CE – Roman Catholic Diocese of Metz active (approximate date).
 407(?) – Metz is attacked by the Vandals and Alans after crossing the Rhine.
 451 – Metz is sacked by the hordes of Attila the Hun during his campaign into Gaul.
 6th C. - Metz becomes capital of Austrasia.
 768 – Metz becomes part of the Carolingian Empire.
 843 – Metz becomes part of Middle Francia.
 863 – Religious council held in Metz.
 1130 – Notre Dame de la Ronde church built.
 13th C.
 Metz becomes a free imperial city of the Holy Roman Empire.
  and Porte des Allemands (gate) construction begins.
 1220 –  built.
 1343 –  (bridge) built.
 1356 – Diet of Metz (1356/57) held; Golden Bull issued.
 1400 – Public clock installed (approximate date).
 1427 – Metz Cathedral spire built.
 1437 –  (tower) construction begins.
 1444 –  by forces of Charles VII of France.
 1482 – Printing press in operation.
 1552
 Metz comes under French rule per Treaty of Chambord.
 Siege of Metz (1552).
 1560 –  (military building) constructed.
 1561 –  (gate) demolished.
 1564 – Metz Citadel built.
 1613 – City customary laws published.
 1633 –  established.
 1648 – Metz officially becomes part of France per Treaty of Westphalia.
 1731 –  construction begins.
 1733 –  built.
 1743 –  (mansion) built.
 1744 – Louis XV of France visits Metz.
 1757 –  founded, as the Société Royale des Sciences et des Arts de Metz.
1760 - R. Samuel Hilman b. Israel Halperin (1670-1766) appointed rabbi of Jewish community in Metz.
 1777 –  built.
 1787 –  (church) built.
 1790 – Metz becomes part of the Moselle souveraineté.
 1793 – Population: 36,878.
 1794 –  (military school) established.(fr)

19th century
 1814 – City successfully defended by the French during the Siege of Metz (1814).
 1816 –  (park) opens.
 1821 – Population: 42,030.
 1831 – Covered Market, Metz opens.
 1835 –  founded.
 1844 – 30 March: Birth of Paul Verlaine.
 1850 –  built.
 1851 –  begins operating.
 1854 – Metz–Luxembourg railway begins operating.
 1861 –  held.
 1864 – Arsenal built.
 1866 – Population: 54,817.
 1868 –  (brewery) founded.
 1870
 Fort de Plappeville and Fort de Queuleu built.
 Siege of Metz (1870); Prussians in power.
 1871
 10 May: Metz becomes part of Germany per the Treaty of Frankfurt (1871).
 Metz becomes part of the Alsace-Lorraine imperial territory.
 1872 –  (military school) established.(fr)
 1877 –  begins operating.
 1878 –  built.
 1881 –  (church) built.

20th century
 1903
 Porte Serpenoise (gate) rebuilt.
 Wilhelm II, German Emperor visits Metz.
 1905
  built.
 Population: 60,419.
 1906 –  becomes part of Metz.
 1907 –  becomes part of Metz.
 1908 – Gare de Metz-Ville (rail station) and Feste Kaiserin (fort) built.
 1910 –  becomes part of Metz.
 1911
  built.
 Population: 68,598.

 1918 – Metz becomes again part of France.
 1919 – Le Républicain Lorrain newspaper begins publication.
 1923 – Stade Saint-Symphorien (stadium) opens.
 1932 – Football Club de Metz formed.
 1936 – Population: 83,119.
 1940
  by Germany during World War II.
 July: Frontstalag 212 prisoner-of-war camp for Allied POWs established by the Germans.
 December: Frontstalag 212 POW camp dissolved. Stalag XII-E POW camp established.
 1942 – Stalag XII-E POW camp dissolved.
 1944
 27 September: Battle of Fort Driant begins near city (part of Battle of Metz).
 13 December: Battle of Metz ends; Germans ousted.
 1947 - December: Flood.
 1954 - Population: 85,701.
 1960 –  cultural venue created.
 1962 – Population: 102,771.
 1970 – Renaissance du vieux Metz (historical society) founded.
 1971 – Jean-Marie Rausch becomes mayor.
 1973 – Lorraine Marathon begins.
 1975 – Groupe Histoire et patrimoine lorrains (historical society) founded.
 1977 –  built in Pontiffroy.
 1979 – Socialist Party national congress held in Metz.
 1980 – Moselle Open tennis tournament begins.
 1982 – Metz becomes part of the Lorraine region.
 1983 – Metz Science Park opens.
 1989 – Arsenal de Metz concert hall opens.
 1991 – Metz–Nancy–Lorraine Airport opens.
 1999 – Population: 123,776.

21st century

 2002 – Arènes de Metz (arena) opens.
 2006 – May:  held in Metz.
 2007 – TGV hi-speed train begins operating.
 2008 – Dominique Gros becomes mayor.
 2010
 Centre Pompidou-Metz opens.
  begins.
 2011 – Population: 119,962.
 2012 – 6 July: 2012 Tour de France cycling race passes through Metz.
 2014 – March:  held.
 2015
 Canton of Metz-1, 2, and 3 created per .
 December:  held.
 2016 – Metz becomes part of the Grand Est region.

See also
 History of Metz
  (Roman-era settlement)
 
 List of historic sites in Metz, France
 
 
  department

Other cities in the Grand Est region:
 Timeline of Mulhouse
 Timeline of Nancy, France
 Timeline of Reims
 Timeline of Strasbourg
 Timeline of Troyes

References

This article incorporates information from the French Wikipedia and German Wikipedia.

Bibliography

in English

in French
 
 
 
  (bibliography)

in German

External links

 
 Items related to Metz, various dates (via Europeana).
 Items related to Metz, various dates (via Digital Public Library of America).

Metz